Leighton P. "Whitey" Gibson (October 6, 1868 – October 12, 1907) was a professional baseball catcher in the major leagues in 1888 for the Philadelphia Athletics of the American Association. He appeared in one major league game for the Philadelphia A's in that year. He remained active in the minor leagues through 1893.

Gibson died in 1907 in Talmadge, Pennsylvania of puerperal mania.

References

External links

1868 births
1907 deaths
Philadelphia Athletics (AA) players
Major League Baseball catchers
Baseball players from Pennsylvania
Sportspeople from Lancaster, Pennsylvania
19th-century baseball players
Lynn Lions players
Salem Witches players
Wilmington Peach Growers players
Harrisburg Ponies players
Altoona Mountaineers players
Reading Actives players
Scranton Miners players